László Farkas (born 1970) is a Hungarian wheelchair tennis player, reaching World No. 15 in the singles July 2007 and World No. 17 in the doubles in November 2003. He has competed at five Paralympic Games reaching the third round at 2004 Summer Paralympics, Farkas has competed at two Grand Slams reaching the second round at the Australian Open and French Open.

References

1970 births
Living people

Hungarian male tennis players

Paralympic wheelchair tennis players of Hungary

Wheelchair tennis players at the 1996 Summer Paralympics
Wheelchair tennis players at the 2000 Summer Paralympics
Wheelchair tennis players at the 2004 Summer Paralympics
Wheelchair tennis players at the 2008 Summer Paralympics
Wheelchair tennis players at the 2012 Summer Paralympics
Place of birth missing (living people)
Date of birth missing (living people)
20th-century Hungarian people
21st-century Hungarian people